The 2006–07 Texas Longhorns men's basketball team represented The University of Texas at Austin in  NCAA Division I intercollegiate men's basketball competition as a member of the Big 12 Conference. The 2006–07 team posted a 25–10 record, finished in third place in the Big 12, and reached the second round of the 2007 NCAA tournament. Forward Kevin Durant received unanimous recognition as the National Player of the Year in 2007 as a true freshman; Durant was the first freshman ever to win any of the national player of the year awards.

Roster

Recruiting

Schedule 

|-
| colspan="9" style="text-align:center;" | Exhibition games
|-style="background: #ddffdd;"
| Tue, Oct 31 || 7 p.m. || Lenoir-Rhyne || #21 || Frank Erwin Center • Austin, Texas || || W 98–64 || || (1–0 exhib.)
|-style="background: #ddffdd;"
| Mon, Nov 6 || 7 p.m. || Xavier (La.) || #21 || Frank Erwin Center • Austin, Texas || || W 103–53 || || (2–0 exhib.)
|-
| colspan="9" style="text-align:center;" | Regular season
|-style="background: #ddffdd;"
| Thu, Nov 9 || 8:30 p.m. || Alcorn State || #21 || Frank Erwin Center • Austin, Texas(2K Sports College Hoops Classic Regional) || ESPNU || W 103–44 || 9623|| 1–0
|-style="background: #ddffdd;"
| Fri, Nov 10 || 8 p.m. || Chicago State || #21 || Frank Erwin Center • Austin, Texas(2K Sports College Hoops Classic Regional) || ESPNU || W 92–66 || 9918|| 2–0
|-style="background: #ffdddd;"
| Thu, Nov 16 || 9:30 p.m. || vs. Michigan State || #19 || Madison Square Garden • New York City(2K Sports College Hoops Classic Semifinal Game 2) || ESPN2 || L 61–63 || || 2–1
|-style="background: #ddffdd;"
| Fri, Nov 17 || 7 p.m. || vs. St. John's || #19 || Madison Square Garden • New York(2K Sports College Hoops Classic Consolation Game) || ESPN2 || W 77–76 || || 3–1
|-style="background: #ddffdd;"
| Tue, Nov 21 || 7 p.m. || Nicholls State || — || Frank Erwin Center • Austin, Texas || FSNSW(Texas) || W 91–60 || 10474 || 4–1
|-style="background: #ddffdd;"
| Tue, Nov 28 || 7 p.m. || Texas Southern || — || Frank Erwin Center • Austin, Texas || FSNSW(Texas) || W 90–50 || 9690|| 5–1
|-style="background: #ffdddd;"
| Sat, Dec 2 || 1:10 p.m. || vs. Gonzaga || — || US Airways Center • Phoenix, Arizona || ESPN || L 77–87 || || 5–2
|-style="background: #ddffdd;"
| Sun, Dec 10 || 7 p.m. || vs. #9 LouisianaState || — || Toyota Center • Houston || ESPN || W 76–75 OT || || 6–2
|-style="background: #ddffdd;"
| Sat, Dec 16 || 3 p.m. || Texas State || — || Frank Erwin Center • Austin, Texas || FSNSW(Texas) || W 96–70 || 10754|| 7–2
|-style="background: #ddffdd;"
| Wed, Dec 20 || 8 p.m. || Arkansas || — || Frank Erwin Center • Austin, Texas || ESPN2 || W 80–76 || 14451|| 8–2
|-style="background: #ffdddd;"
| Sat, Dec 23 || noon || @ Tennessee || — || Thompson–Boling Arena • Knoxville, Tennessee || ESPN || L 105–111 OT || || 8–3
|-style="background: #ddffdd;"
| Thu, Dec 28 || 7 p.m. || Centenary || — || Frank Erwin Center • Austin, Texas || FSNSW(Texas) || W 76–66 || 10913|| 9–3
|-style="background: #ddffdd;"
| Tue, Jan 2 || 7 p.m. || Texas-Arlington || — || Frank Erwin Center • Austin, Texas || FSNSW(Texas) || W 84–52 || 9732|| 10–3
|-style="background: #ddffdd;"
| Sat, Jan 6 || 2:01 p.m. || @ Colorado* || — || Coors Events Center • Boulder, Colorado || ESPN Plus || W 102–78 || || 11–3(1–0 Big 12)
|-style="background: #ddffdd;"
| Wed, Jan 10 || 7 p.m. || Missouri* || #25 || Frank Erwin Center • Austin, Texas || FSNSW(Texas) || W 88–68 || 11983|| 12–3 (2–0)
|-style="background: #ddffdd;"
| Sat, Jan 13 || 2:30 p.m. || Oklahoma* || #25 || Frank Erwin Center • Austin, Texas || ABC || W 80–69 || 14935|| 13–3 (3–0)
|-style="background: #ffdddd;"
| Tue, Jan 16 || 8:05 p.m. || @ #12 Oklahoma State* || #21 || Gallagher-Iba Arena • Stillwater, Oklahoma || ESPN2 || L 103–105 3OT || || 13–4 (3–1)
|-style="background: #ffdddd;"
| Sat, Jan 20 || 1:37 p.m. || @ Villanova || #21 || Wachovia Center • Philadelphia || CBS || L 69–76 || || 13–5
|-style="background: #ddffdd;"
| Wed, Jan 24 || 7:05 p.m. || @ Nebraska* || — || Devaney Center • Lincoln, Nebraska || FSNSW (Texas) || W 62–61 || || 14–5 (4–1)
|-style="background: #ddffdd;"
| Sat, Jan 27 || 5 p.m. || Baylor* || — || Frank Erwin Center • Austin, Texas || ESPN2 || W 84–79 || 15256|| 15–5 (5–1)
|-style="background: #ddffdd;"
| Wed, Jan 31 || 8 p.m. || @ Texas Tech* || #22 || United Spirit Arena • Lubbock, Texas || ESPN2 || W 76–64 || || 16–5 (6–1)
|-style="background: #ffdddd;"
| Sat, Feb 3 || 2:30 p.m. || Kansas State* || #22 || Frank Erwin Center • Austin, Texas || ABC || L 72–73 || 15709|| 16–6 (6–2)
|-style="background: #ffdddd;"
| Mon, Feb 5 || 8 p.m. || @ #6 Texas A&M* || — || Reed Arena • College Station, Texas || ESPN || L 82–100 || || 16–7 (6–3)
|-style="background: #ddffdd;"
| Sat, Feb 10 || 12:47 p.m. || Iowa State* || — || Frank Erwin Center • Austin, Texas || ESPN Plus || W 77–68 || 14743|| 17–7 (7–3)
|-style="background: #ddffdd;"
| Mon, Feb 12 || 8 p.m. || #18 Oklahoma State* || — || Frank Erwin Center • Austin, Texas || ESPN || W 83–54 || 15815|| 18–7 (8–3)
|-style="background: #ddffdd;"
| Sat, Feb 17 || 7 p.m. || @ Baylor* || — || Ferrell Center • Waco, Texas || FSNSW(Texas) || W 68–67 || || 19–7 (9–3)
|-style="background: #ddffdd;"
| Tue, Feb 20 || 8 p.m. || Texas Tech* || #19 || Frank Erwin Center • Austin, Texas || ESPN Plus || W 80–51 || 16753|| 20–7 (10–3)
|-style="background: #ddffdd;"
| Sat, Feb 24 || 3 p.m. || @ Oklahoma* || #19 || Lloyd Noble Center • Norman, Oklahoma || ESPNU/ESPN Plus || W 68–58 || || 21–7 (11–3)
|-style="background: #ddffdd;"
| Wed, Feb 28 || 8 p.m. || #7 Texas A&M* || #15 || Frank Erwin Center • Austin, Texas || ESPN2 || W 98–96 2OT || 16755|| 22–7 (12–3)
|-style="background: #ffdddd;"
| Sat, Mar 3 || 11 a.m. || @ #3 Kansas* || #15 || Allen Fieldhouse • Lawrence, Kansas || CBS || L 86–90 || || 22–8 (12–4)
|-
| colspan="9" | 
|-style="background: #ddffdd;"
| Fri, Mar 9 || 8:20 p.m. || vs. (11) Baylor* || #15 || Ford Center • Oklahoma City(Big 12 Conference tournament quarterfinals) || ESPN Plus || W 74–69 || || 23–8
|-style="background: #ddffdd;"
| Sat, Mar 10 || 3:20 p.m. || vs. (7) Oklahoma State* || #15 || Ford Center • Oklahoma City(Big 12 Conference tournament semifinals) || ESPN2 || W 69–64 || || 24–8
|-style="background: #ffdddd;"
| Sun, Mar 11 || 2 p.m. || vs. (1) #2 Kansas* || #15 || Ford Center • Oklahoma City(Big 12 Conference tournament finals) || ESPN || L 84–88 OT || || 24–9
|-
| colspan="9" | 
|-style="background: #ddffdd;"
| Fri, Mar 16 || 4:30 p.m. || vs. (13) New Mexico State || #11 || Spokane Arena • Spokane, Washington(NCAA Tournament first round) || CBS || W 79–67 || || 25–9
|-style="background: #ffdddd;"
| Sun, Mar 18 || 2:15 p.m. || vs. (5) Southern California || #11 || Spokane Arena • Spokane, Washington(NCAA Tournament second round) || CBS || L 68–87 || || 25–10
|-
| colspan="9" | *Big 12 Conference Game. †All times in Central Standard Time. #Rank according to Associated Press (AP) Poll. OT indicates overtime.
|}

References 

Texas Longhorns men's basketball seasons
Texas
Texas
2006 in sports in Texas
2007 in sports in Texas